José Miguel Pérez (born 7 June 1938) is a Puerto Rican fencer. He competed in the individual and team épée events at the 1968 Summer Olympics.

References

1938 births
Living people
People from Quebradillas, Puerto Rico
Puerto Rican male fencers
Olympic fencers of Puerto Rico
Fencers at the 1968 Summer Olympics